The Arts of Mankind (in French L’Univers des formes), an ambitious series of art history survey books founded in 1960 for the French publisher Gallimard by André Malraux, who edited many of the volumes in collaboration with art historian Georges Salles. Over 40 volumes have appeared to date; roughly half have been translated into English, as follows:

Sumer: The Dawn of Art, by André Parrot
The Arts of Assyria, by André Parrot
The Birth of Greek Art, by Pierre Demargne
Carolingian Art, by Jean Hubert, Jean Porcher and WF Volbach
African Art, by André Parrot
The Studios and Styles of the Italian Renaissance: Italy 1460-1500, by André Chastel
Europe of the Invasions, by Jean Hubert
Archaic Greek Art 620-480 B.C., by Jean Charbonneaux, Roland Martin, and Francois Villard
Classical Greek Art 480-330 B.C., by Jean Charbonneaux, Roland Martin, and Francois Villard
Hellenistic Art 330-50 B.C, by Jean Charbonneaux
The Arts of the South Pacific, by Jean Guiart
The View Painters of Europe, by Giuliano Briganti
Rome: the Center of power, by Ranuccio Bianchi Bandinelli 
Rome: the Late Empire, Roman art AD 200-400, by Ranuccio Bianchi Bandinelli
Early Christian Art: from the Rise of Christianity to the Death of Theodosius, by André Grabar
Persian art, the Parthian and Sassanian Dynasties, 249 B.C. - 651 A.D., by Charles K. Wilkinson
Nineveh and Babylon, by André Parrot
The Flowering of the Italian Renaissance, by André Chastel
The Golden Age of Justinian, from the death of Theodosius to the rise of Islam, by André Grabar
The Art of Ancient Iran: from its origins to the time of Alexander the Great, by Roman Ghirshman

Art history books
Éditions Gallimard books